In the fields of mergers and acquisitions and corporate finance, a material adverse change (abbreviated MAC), material adverse event (MAE), or material adverse effect (also MAE) is a change in circumstances that significantly reduces the value of a company. A contract to acquire, invest in, or lend money to a company often contains a  term that allows the acquirer, investor, or lender to cancel the transaction if a material adverse change occurs. Where an acquiring company uses its own stock as part of the consideration paid to acquire another company, or in a merger of two companies, the contract may provide that either party to the transaction can cancel it if a material adverse change significantly reduces the value of the other party. 

Large transactions often require a long period of time between the signing of a contract and  completion of the transaction. For example, time may be required to obtain approval of the transaction by government agencies, shareholders, labor unions, lenders, or others. Until the transaction is completed, the companies involved go on about their business and are subject to risks.

Contract terms that deal with material adverse changes are carefully negotiated by the parties and take into account the relevant circumstances of each party. Thus, the definition of material adverse changes is unique to each contract.

When a party to a contract claims that a material adverse change had occurred and refuses to complete the transaction on that ground, the other party may disagree and litigation may ensue. One notable example of this was the planned acquisition of SLM Corporation (formerly known as Sallie Mae) by a group including Bank of America and JPMorgan Chase. In the United States, much of this litigation occurs in the Delaware Court of Chancery because many large American companies are organized under Delaware law. According to a precedent of that court, the party that seeks to avoid completion of a transaction must prove that a material adverse change as defined by the parties' contract has occurred.

References

External links
2015 Annual MAC Survey from Nixon Peabody
2014 Annual MAC Survey from Nixon Peabody
2013 Annual MAC Survey from Nixon Peabody
2012 Annual MAC Survey from Nixon Peabody
American Bar Association: Revisiting the MAC Clause in Transaction Agreements
2011 Annual MAC Survey from Nixon Peabody
Several examples of MAC clauses
Accredited Home Lenders v. Lone Star Funds: A MAC Case Study
Drafting Material Adverse Change Clauses from McDermott Will & Emery

Legal terminology
Mergers and acquisitions
Financial law